The Bahrain Davis Cup team represents Bahrain in Davis Cup tennis competition and are governed by the Bahrain Tennis Federation.

Bahrain currently compete in the Asia/Oceania Zone of Group IV.  They have won their opening match in Group II on two occasions.

History
 Bahrain competed in its first Davis Cup in 1989.
 The team has played a total of 23 years in the Davis Cup

Current team (2022) 

TBD

See also
Davis Cup

References

External links

Davis Cup teams
Davis Cup
Davis Cup